The Krobo people are an ethnic group in Ghana. They are grouped as part of Ga-Adangbe ethnolinguistic group and they are also the largest group of the seven Dangme ethnic groups of Southeastern Ghana. The Krobo are a farming people who occupy Accra Plains, Akuapem Mountains and the Afram Basin.

History
The Krobos (pronounced krorbors) are a few select people from the Eastern Region of Ghana. They are divided into the Manya and the Yilo.  The exact date on which the Krobos divided themselves into Yilo and Manya remains a mystery. In earlier years Manya Krobo was referred by the Government of Ghana as Eastern Krobo, while the Yilo Krobo was referred as the Western Krobo. From that date to the present day, the Krobo have been administered as two separate states, named today as Manya and Yilo Krobo.

The two Krobo traditional areas were originally known as "Nɔwe" that is Mănyă, meaning "ones home", and Nyέwe (Yilɔ). The name Manya came from the word "Maonya", literally meaning "keep your mouth shut". This goes with the saying "nɔ bi nya me tee" – literally meaning "one does not need to talk about everything one sees". Yilo, on the other hand, comes from the expression "wa yilɔ", meaning "we don't eat that".  Some oral traditions have it that, when the Yilo returned from Krobo Denkyera, they lost most of their indigenous Krobo customs; as a result of that, they were taken through series of acculturation rites to be accepted by society. This process involved orientation for meals that the Krobos tabooed. The Yilo continued to verify the acceptability of various foods they learnt to eat while they were with the Akan. The resident Krobo started calling them the derogatory term "Wa yilɔ", meaning "we told you we don't eat this".

There is some evidence to suggest that the Krobos and the other Dangme groups came from north-eastern Africa, specifically ancient Egypt and surrounding areas in what is now called the Middle East. The Krobos, like other migratory groups from north-eastern Africa, were victims of a series of invasions in Egypt from 600 BC to the 14th century AD causing corresponding migrations at each invasion(2,3,4). Our ancestors were pushed down to the Chad area of the Sudan and were one of the groups that moved to the bend of river Niger in the western Sudan where they were part of the empires that flourished and demised, the latest one being the Songhai Empire that fell at the end of the 16th century (1591)(4,5).
A migration at the end of the Songhai Empire brought them back to lake Chad area. They then moved southwards to Niger and through western Nigeria to Sameh between present Nigeria and Benin (Dahomeh), with notable stops at Widah (Ouidah) and Huatsi, from where they continued the journey with other proto-Dangme groups. As they passed through these places, they left behind and also picked up cultural traits of those areas among whom they sojourned and passed through. The Krobos regard the Ewe groups of Dahomeh and Togo as friends hence they call the Ewes "Wa Huέhi", which corrupted to "Ohuέli", literary meaning "Our friends". They had to continue their journey, and at the point of departure from their Ewe friends it appeared there was an emotional upheaval and they called the point of departure Lorlorvor, meaning "love has ended". They crossed the Volta River only to find themselves surrounded by the Guans and Akan peoples on all sides, hence they call the Akan people Ohieli, meaning the multitudinous people. The fear of this new group pushed them to climb the huge isolated mountain on the plains near the Volta River, which is called Krobo Mountain up to the present day. They arrived in present-day Ghana at the beginning of the 17th century.

The Krobos are the most numerous of the Ga-Adangme-speaking peoples. They are located in the mountains just inland from the coast and are the fourth largest ethnic group in the country. During the 19th century they were one of the small states of the Gold Coast in the formative stages of political and cultural development. After the middle of the 19th century they became economically and politically one of the most important groups in the country because of their dominant role in commercial production of export crops as well as beading.

Journey to Krobo Mountain

The Dangme people travelled as one group, and it was not until their arrival in Ghana that they split into the seven Dangme groups that are known of today. The place of their split was renamed "Lɔlɔvɔ", an Ewe term meaning "Love is finished (ended)". The place is still in existence and is now known as the Tagologo Plains.

The seven Dangme groups are: Krobo, Ada, Prampram, Shai, Ningo, Osu-Doku, and Kpone. The Osudoku people climbed the Osudoku mountain, the Ada people went to the east coast, the Shai, Prampram and Kpone people travelled inland. The Ningo people also travelled southwards to the coast.
After the split, the Krobo people pressed on towards the west until they saw a 1,108-feet-high mountain with a gorge (valley) dividing it into two unequal sections. The people believed this would be a good place to settle, as the climb to the top of the mountain would be difficult, meaning it would be a safe place for habitation and to repulse attacks from invading tribes and enemies. Two leading hunters – Aklo Muase (Aklo Natebi) and Madja – were sent by priests to ascertain the suitability of the mountain for settlement.

The report that came back confirmed that this was indeed a good place for habitation and the mountain later became known as "Klo yo" (Krobo Mountain). In fact the name "Krobo" is of Akan origin and is derived from the term "Kro-obo-so-Foɔ", meaning "Town of rock/mountain dwellers".

Life on Krobo Mountain

The Mountain became the cultural and ritual centre for the Krobo people. It was a town of stone houses, many stories with several rooms – some accounts state there were some houses with 20–30 rooms. In fact, missionaries who visited the mountain stated that the architecture was like nothing they had seen in Africa before.
The Krobo developed their own watering system on the mountain to support their growing population. When the population grew beyond the mountain, the people started spending more time in the surrounding areas. In fact, through the Krobo Huza system of land acquisition the Krobo people managed to acquire large amounts of land in the surrounding areas in what Field referred to as the "Bloodless conquest". Krobo Mountain continued to be the centre for religious and cultural affairs until their eviction.

Krobo military

From the 17th century, the Krobo Mountain became a place of several attacks from invading tribes and enemies. However the Krobo people were always able to fight off the enemy and it was only through the introduction of Rockets and Rifle fire by the British that the Krobo were able to be defeated.

Eviction from Krobo Mountain

Krobo Mountain was the spiritual and physical home of the Krobo people. It was the first settlement of the Krobo people after the split from the other Dangme Groups in Lɔlɔvɔ. The mountain was chosen because it was the ideal protection from the constant warfare at the time. In fact the Krobos won many wars by simply rolling boulders down the mountain – which would prevent the enemy from coming up and kill many of them in the process. As the population increased, many Krobos would work on farms in the areas surrounding the mountain. The Mountain, however, continued to be the centre of culture, where all important rituals took place. Girls undergoing the Dipo rite of passage would traditionally spend one–three years on the mountain going through the Dipo customs. It was taboo for the Djemli (priests) to leave the mountain overnight. Moreover, as their ancestors were buried in family homes on the mountain, the mountain became the ancestral home not just spiritually but literally. 

However, this proved a problem for the colonial Government as the people were very hard to monitor and therefore control from their mountain settlements. Many reports came back that the seclusion of the mountain allowed certain warrior cults to be practised and laws to be broken (e.g. only burying your dead in the cemetery) without repercussions. As a result, the mountain was viewed by the colonial government as a Fetish mountain and when Governor Griffiths had the opportunity to remove the Krobo from the mountain he did that with the Native Customs Ordinance of 1892. The Governor gave the people up to three days to vacate the mountain. Many Krobo people were living in the surrounding areas at the foot of the mountain, working on their farms, and, as was to be expected, for those at the foot of the mountain and further afield (some even a few days away), it was very hard to travel to the mountain, collect belongings and bring them down within the three-day limit. So people could only carry what they could and the rest was left on the mountain and later destroyed. The colonial government sent soldiers to destroy everything, from the houses and shrines to pots and even old trees. It was a sad moment for the Krobo people, and that is why to this day both the Manya and Yilo Krobos organise a pilgrimage to the Mountain every year to commemorate this day. This pilgrimage usually occurs during the Ngmayem and Kloyosikplem festivals.

Gallery

References

Ethnic groups in Ghana